Coexist may refer to:
 Coexist (album), a 2012 album by The xx
 Coexist (song), 2019 song by Coldrain
 Coexist Foundation, a charitable organization based in London, England
 Coexist (image)

See also
 Coexistence (disambiguation)